The 1919 Hessian state election was held on 26 January 1919 to elect the 70 members of the Hessian constituent people's assembly.

Results

References 

Hesse
1919
January 1919 events in Europe
January 1919 events